Laurențiu Nicolae Corbu (born 10 May 1994) is a Romanian footballer who plays as a defender for Liga II club CSA Steaua București.

Club career

Dinamo București
Corbu joined Dinamo Bucureșt in 2015, signing from Urban Titu.

St Mirren(loan)
In January 2019, Corbu joined Scottish side St Mirren on loan until the end of the season.

Chindia Târgoviște
On 11 February 2020, Corbu joined Romanian club Chindia Târgoviște.

Honours
Dinamo București
Cupa României runner-up: 2015–16
Cupa Ligii: 2016–17

References

External links

 
 

1994 births
Living people
People from Dâmbovița County
Romanian footballers
Association football midfielders
Liga I players
FC Dinamo București players
AFC Chindia Târgoviște players
CSA Steaua București footballers
Scottish Professional Football League players
St Mirren F.C. players
Romanian expatriate footballers
Romanian expatriate sportspeople in Scotland
Expatriate footballers in Scotland